Parallax is a quarterly peer-reviewed academic journal publishing work in cultural studies, critical theory and philosophy. Each issue has a theme and issues are regularly compiled by guest-editors. The journal was established in 1995 by Adrian Rifkin, Marq Smith and Joanne Morra, and is now published by Routledge. The editors are Elspeth Mitchell, Dominic O'Key, Rebecca Starr, and Ruth Daly (University of Leeds). The reviews editor is Agnieszka Jasnowska.

Abstracting and indexing 
The journal is abstracted and indexed in

External links 
 

Taylor & Francis academic journals
English-language journals
Cultural journals
Philosophy journals
Publications established in 1995
Quarterly journals